Cutaneous branch of musculospiral may refer to:

 Posterior cutaneous nerve of forearm, also known as external cutaneous branch of musculospiral nerve
 Posterior cutaneous nerve of arm, also known as internal cutaneous branch of musculospiral nerve